Dagba (Daba) is a language of the Sara people in Central African Republic and Chad.

References

Bongo–Bagirmi languages